Vasco Gil Moniz (formerly Vasco Gil) (died Lisbon, 1497) was a Portuguese nobleman.

Life
He was the second born son of Gil Aires and wife Leonor Rodrigues.

He was a Vedor of Infante Peter, Duke of Coimbra, son of King John I of Portugal.

Marriages and issue
He married firstly Catarina Fernandes, daughter of Fernão Rodrigues, a Knight, and wife, to whom King Afonso V of Portugal made the grace of restoring the estate that had been taken from her husband for having turned to Infante Peter, Duke of Coimbra at the Battle of Alfarrobeira in the year of 1449, without issue.

Later he married secondly before 1459 Eléonore de Lusignan, in Portuguese called Leonor, originary of the Kingdom of Cyprus and of the lineage of the Kings of that Kingdom for being a daughter of Phoebus de Lusignan (in Portuguese called Febo or Febos), Titular Marshal of Armenia and Titular Lord of Sidon, and wife, whose name is unknown. She was married firstly in 1450/1455 or 1451/1452 to Soffredo Crispo (d. 1458), Lord of Nisyros, of the Dukes of Naxos, without issue, and died in Lisbon around 1475. She was said to have come from Aragon as a Dame of Isabella of Aragon, Countess of Urgell, wife of Infante Peter, Duke of Coimbra, but most likely met her husband when he went to Cyprus in the company of Infante John of Portugal who was marrying Charlotte de Lusignan, Queen of Cyprus. He returned to Portugal with his wife either when his master Charlotte's first husband was murdered or, after deciding to stay after that event, when his master's widow was deposed and at the same time his father in law Phoebus left Cyprus, returning to his country instead of going to Rome with him.

For this reason their issue bore both the Arms of the Moniz and de Lusignan families joint. They were both buried in his Chapel of Our Lady of Piety at the Carmo Convent in Lisbon in a tomb with the mentioned Arms.

They had three children, Febo Moniz de Lusignan, Guiomar Moniz and Pedro Álvares Moniz.

Sources
 Manuel João da Costa Felgueiras Gaio, "Nobiliário das Famílias de Portugal", Tomo Vigésimo Primeiro, Título de Monizes, § 17, § 18 e § 19
 Various Authors, "Armorial Lusitano", Lisbon, 1961, pp. 370-372
 Dom Augusto Romano Sanches de Baena e Farinha de Almeida Portugal Sousa e Silva, 1.º Visconde de Sanches de Baena, "Archivo Heraldico-Genealógico", Lisbon, 1872, Volume II, p. CXV
 Cristóvão Alão de Morais, "Pedatura Lusitana", Volume I (reformulated edition), pp. 668-670

Portuguese nobility
Year of birth unknown
1497 deaths
15th-century Portuguese people